34th Reconnaissance Squadron may refer to:
 The 423d Bombardment Squadron, designated the 34th Reconnaissance Squadron (Heavy) from March 1942 to April 1942.  
 The 34th Reconnaissance Squadron (Fighter), active from April 1943 to August 1943, but never fully manned or equipped.

See also
 The 34th Photographic Reconnaissance Squadron